Chavanod is a commune in the Haute-Savoie department and Auvergne-Rhône-Alpes region of eastern France. It is part of the urban area of Annecy.

Geography
The river Fier forms parts of the commune's northern border.

See also
Communes of the Haute-Savoie department

References

External links

Gazetteer Entry

Communes of Haute-Savoie